Nuno Miguel Madeira Fernandes Félix (born 16 March 2004) is a Portuguese professional footballer who plays as a midfielder for Benfica B.

Club career
In 2016, after four seasons with Portimonense, Félix joined Benfica. He signed his first professional contract in September 2020.

International career
Félix has represented Portugal at youth international level.

Career statistics

Club

Notes

Honours
Benfica
Campeonato Nacional de Juniores: 2021–22
 UEFA Youth League: 2021–22
Under-20 Intercontinental Cup: 2022

References

2004 births
Living people
People from Portimão
Portuguese footballers
Portugal youth international footballers
Association football midfielders
Liga Portugal 2 players
Portimonense S.C. players
S.L. Benfica footballers
S.L. Benfica B players
Sportspeople from Faro District